Skeleton is an album by Figurines, released in 2005.

Track listing
"Race You" – 3:02
"The Wonder" – 3:06
"All Night" – 2:22
"Silver Ponds" – 2:48
"Ambush" – 3:08
"Rivalry" – 5:49
"I Remember" – 2:38
"Other Plans" – 3:23
"Ghost Towns" – 2:56
"Continuous Songs" – 2:40
"Fiery Affair" – 2:59
"Wrong Way All the Way" – 2:16
"Back in the Day" – 2:14
"Release Me on the Floor" – 5:49

2005 albums
Figurines albums